Mick Delroy (born 3 February 1965) is an Australian former rugby league footballer who played in the 1980s and 1990s. He played for the Parramatta Eels with whom he won the 1986 premiership. Delroy also played for Eastern Suburbs. His position was on the wing.

Playing career
Delroy made his first grade debut for Parramatta in round 11 of the 1986 season against South Sydney.

In the 1986 grand final, Delroy was knocked out in the first half from a tackle by Canterbury winger Andrew Farrar.  Parramatta went on to win the match 4–2 in a tryless grand final.

In 2016, Delroy spoke to the media about the grand final victory and said that in the 30 years since the win he had not been to a single reunion or even watched a replay of the game.

In 1989, Delroy made the move to Eastern Suburbs and played eight games for the club over two seasons before retiring at the end of the 1990 season.

References

1965 births
Living people
Australian rugby league players
Parramatta Eels players
Rugby league wingers
Rugby league players from Sydney
Sydney Roosters players